Map of places in Midlothian compiled from this list
See the list of places in Scotland for places in other counties.

This List of places in Midlothian is a list of links for any town, village, hamlet, castle, golf course, historic house, hill fort, lighthouse, nature reserve, reservoir, river, and other place of interest in the Midlothian council area of Scotland.

A
Allermuir Hill
Arniston, Arniston House
Auchendinny

B
Beeslack Wood
Birkenside
Bonaly Reservoir
Bonnyrigg
Borthwick, Borthwick Castle
Butterfly and Insect World

C
Carrington
Castle Law
Cotty Burn
Cousland, Cousland Smiddy
Craigesk
Crichton, Crichton Castle, Crichton Collegiate Church

D
Dalhousie Castle, Dalhousie Falconry Centre
Dalkeith, Dalkeith Estate, Dalkeith Palace
Danderhall
Dewartown
Dun Law

E
Easter Howgate
Easthouses, Easthouses Colliery
Edgehead
Edgelaw Reservoir
Eight Mile Burn
Eskbank

F
Fairfield House
Fala
Flotterstone, Flotterstone Visitor Centre
Fountainhill
Fushiebridge

G
Gladhouse Reservoir
Glencorse Reservoir
Gore Glen Woodland Park
Gorebridge
Gowkshill

H
Habbies Howe
Hawthornden Castle
Hillend
Hirendean Castle
Howgate

L
Lasswade
Leadburn
Loanhead
Loganlea Reservoir

M
Mavisbank House
Mayfield
Middleton
Midlothian Snowsports Centre
Millerhill
Milton Bridge
Moorfoot Hills

N
National Mining Museum
Newbattle, Newbattle Abbey
Newtongrange
Newton Village
Nine Mile Burn
North Esk Reservoir
North Middleton

O
Old Pentland Cemetery
Orchard
Oxenfoord Castle

P
Pathhead
Pittendreich House and Pittendreich Mill, Pittendreich
Penicuik, Penicuik House, Penicuik North Kirk
Pentland Hills, Pentland Hills Regional Park
Preston Hall

R
Riddel
River Esk
Rosewell
Roslin, Battle of Roslin, Roslin Castle, Rosslyn Chapel, Roslin Glen Country Park

S
Saltersgate School
Shawfair
Silverburn
South Esk Valley Way
Straiton Pond

T
Temple
Turnhouse Hill
Tyne Water
Tyne-Esk Walk

V
Vogrie, Vogrie Country Park, Vogrie Golf Club, Vogrie House

W
Wallace's Cave
Whitehill
Woodburn
Woodhouselee

Gallery

See also
List of places in Scotland

Midlothian
Geography of Midlothian
Lists of places in Scotland
Populated places in Scotland